Ottachilambu (ml; ഒറ്റച്ചിലമ്പ്‌) is an Indian horror television series in Malayalam Language  launched on Mazhavil Manorama channel on 24 October 2016 .It aired from Monday to Friday at 08:30 .P.M.

Synopsis
A 6-year child is born "Devooty" who is born in same star sign and date of the mesmerising beauty called "Syamandakam"; who incubates into the body of the child. Syamandakam was burnt alive in the historically old ‘Eloor’ palace. Syamandakam takes a revenge note through Devooty to those who killed her & her family. In the process she falls in love with a young guy Adikeshavan; who helps her to take the revenge. The story puts light at the core to the 
aspirations and ambitions of those who die before fulfilling their lives

Plot
Ambika (Manju Satheesh) is a charming, lovely girl from Eloor kovilakam, her parents passed away years back and she lives with her aunt and uncle who are thampuran and thampuratti (Urmila) of Kovilakam. She has a liking towards her Malayalam teacher Andrews (Anand) and they plan to leave the town and marry. After years they have a daughter (Manjadi), they live in Adivaram In a rental house. They plan to buy a new house after which Ambika plans to go and meet her aunty, she is pregnant but unfortunately both dies in a bike accident. Devooty is all alone, is admitted in a hospital due to pneumonia, their neighbors who took her to hospital refuse to pay money for her operation. Kiran who is devooty's friend stole money from temple for this purpose and is caught by police .Deva goes back home and see that the owner has locked the house, she takes her bag and leave the city to Kodungaloor to meet Thampuratti. Fortunately  she meets Swami in a bus to ernakulam and tell her story. He takes her with him promising to take her to the kovilakam, she became favorite of everyone in the temple where the swami took her.

Meanwhile, Adhikeshavan comes to stay in Chavadi and opens the room even after Chinmaya's restriction (where Syamanakam is lies) .He talks to the spirit and understands her feeling.
Arundhati(Sarika) and Ravi(Rajeev) and all other family members reunite in the kovilakam for the partition of properties which Thampuratti restricts. Thampurayti on her visit to temple with Chinmayi and Adiyodi meets Devooty and identity who she is and takes her to kovilakam as Adhi's daughter
Syamadakam takes her real form to take revenge .

Production 
The promos of the series was already telecast-ed through channels official YouTube page and through the television. This show  replaced on-air series titled Ponnambili .
Casting
Malayalam actress Nithya Das signed into play lead role which marked her come back to Malayalam industry after 5 years. She has done a few television serials before and currently she is doing a Tamil serial too. 
Urmila Unni also plays a pivotal role in the series, it is the first time she is doing a role a thampuratty.

Popular TV actors Rajeev Parameshwar and Harishanth plays the male leads. Harishanth who was last seen in Ente Penn 2014 TV series is playing a strong character named Aadhikeshavan, who investigates in ghosts .New comer - Child artist Manjadi plays one of the lead roles in this series.

Cast

References 

2016 Indian television series debuts
Malayalam-language television shows
Mazhavil Manorama original programming